Sacred Ground: A Tribute to Mother Earth is a compilation album of Native American music released through Silver Wave Records on September 13, 2005. In 2006, the album won Jim Wilson the Grammy Award for Best Native American Music Album.

Track listing
 "Sacred Ground", performed by Bill Miller – 6:20
 "Can You Hear the Call", performed by Robert Mirabal – 6:36
 "Mountain Song" – 6:00
 "Spirit Wind", performed by Bill Miller – 5:05
 "Seeking Light", performed by Joanne Shenandoah – 6:13
 "Raven", performed by Little Wolf Band – 5:43
 "People of Yesterday", performed by Robert Mirabal – 5:00
 "Prayers in the Wind", performed by Little Wolf Band – 4:06
 "Let Us Dance" – 5:15
 "Mother Earth", performed by Joanne Shenandoah, Walela – 4:49

Personnel

 Walker Barnard – bass, bass guitar, programming, engineer
 David Carson – narrator, spoken word
 Mark Clark – percussion
 Priscilla Coolidge – vocals
 Rita Coolidge – vocals
 Dave Glasser – mastering
 Paul Groetzinger – drums
 James Marienthal – coordination, photography
 Johnny Mike – vocals
 Bill Miller – acoustic guitar, flute, guitar, vocals
 Robert Mirabal – flute, composer, vocals
 Star Nayea – vocals
 Verdell Primeaux – vocals
 Valerie Sanford – art producer
 Laura Satterfield – vocals
 Joanne Shenandoah – composer, vocals
 John Thomas – producer
 Walela – vocals
 Jim Wilson – bass, keyboards, programming, audio production
 Shane Wilson – composer, programming
 Ben Wright – electric guitar, e-bow
 Neil Young – composer
 Kevin Zornig – bass guitar, programming

References

2005 compilation albums
Grammy Award for Best Native American Music Album